J. Lincoln Fenn (born 1970) is an American author of contemporary horror. Her debut novel Poe was the 2013 Amazon Breakthrough Novel Award finalist in the Science Fiction/Fantasy/Horror category, and was subsequently published by 47North. Gallery Books, a division of Simon & Schuster, published Fenn's second novel Dead Souls, and released her third novel, The Nightmarchers, in October 2018.

Biography 
Fenn was born in Holyoke, Massachusetts, and raised in The Berkshires. She graduated summa cum laude from the University of New Hampshire with a bachelor's degree in English. Currently, she lives in Seattle, Washington.

Work

Novels 

 Poe (47North, October 2013)
 Dead Souls (Gallery Books, September 2016)
 The Nightmarchers (Gallery Books, October 2018)

References

External links 
 Official website
 Interview: J. Lincoln Fenn at Nightmare Magazine

1970 births
American women writers
Living people
21st-century American women